Red Letter Day is a 1976 British television anthology series screened on ITV, and produced by Granada Television. The series consists of seven stand alone teleplays that aired between 11 January 1976, and 22 February 1976.
 Each teleplay examined the events in a single, special day in someone's life. The series first teleplay, "Ready When You Are, Mr. McGill", was nominated for the British Academy Television Award for Best Single Drama in 1977.

Episodes

References

External links
Red Letter Day at IMDB

1970s British drama television series
1976 British television series debuts
1976 British television series endings
1970s British anthology television series
1970s British television miniseries
ITV miniseries
English-language television shows
Television series by ITV Studios
Television shows produced by Granada Television